Chiro (also called Carcar ciroo in Oromo and "Asebe Teferi" in pervious time) 
is a town and Aanaa in eastern Ethiopia. It is the administrative center of the West Hararghe Zone in Oromia Regional State.

History
Chiro(Asebe Teferi) was founded around 1924 by Fitawrari Tekle Hawariat Tekle Mariyam on the site of a village named Chiro. It was the capital of the former "model" province of Chercher, created as part of Emperor Haile Selassie's campaign of modernization in the 1930s.

Post – 1941 Developments 
Nega Mezlekia described the town when he came to live there in 1977 as "a melancholic small town whose drab conditions are accentuated by the black roads, laid with crushed basaltic rocks" which "snakes along the edge of the main highway that links the city of Harar with the capital city". He describes the buildings in the town as unkept and rundown: "Generations of neglect were written into the faces of these derelict buildings. The walls had shed their meagre mud linings, and a few of the buildings tilted to one side or another, making it as dangerous a proposition to stand in their scant shade as to live in them." His opinion of the inhabitants is equally unkind, detailing how at night the marketplace was transformed into a stage where drunken peasants perpetuated blood feuds generations old. "Peasants didn't go to police or courts for justice. Blood called for blood."

During the 1950s, the coffee plantations around the town were small yet yielded a relatively high production. In 1958, Chiro was one of 27 places in Ethiopia officially ranked as First Class Township. The Ethiopian News Agency reported in mid-July 1976 that negotiations held at Chiro by representatives of hostile groups of the Afars and Issas had led to a peace agreement. When Nega Mezlekia visited the town the following year, he learned that the Ethiopian People's Revolutionary Party and Oromo National Liberation Movement were more active around Chiro than in the rest of the province. "There was a strong peasant base around the town that provided a great deal of support for the party. The forest cover in the areas nearby furnished hideout." However, when he returned in 1978, he found the town far more peaceful. "It seemed that most of the threatening political opponents of the regime were dead, in exile or rotting in prison, and the going was good for those in power."

Demographics
The Oromo make up the largest ethnic group in the town. The Gadabuursi subclan of the (Somali) Dir make up a significant portion of the town and region's inhabitants. The 2007 national census reported a total population for this town of 33,670, of whom 18,118 were men and 15,552 were women.  The majority of the inhabitants said they were Muslim, with 49.88% of the population reporting they observed this belief, while 43.34% of the population practised Ethiopian Orthodox Christianity and 5.33% of the population were Protestant.

The 1994 national census reported this town had a total population of 18,678 of whom 9,218 were males and 9,460 were females.

References

Populated places in the Oromia Region
Ethiopia
Cities and towns in Ethiopia